Crazy People is a 2018 Nollywood comic film produced and directed by Moses Inwang. The film focused on mental problems and impersonation in the Society in a very entertaining and educative way. The film stars Sola Sobowale, Ireti Doyle, Monalisa Chinda, Desmond Elliot, Kunle Afolayan, Bryan Okwara, and Benjamin Toutoui.

Synopsis 
A popular Nollywood star returns to the industry for just one Mission; to find his impostor.

Premiere 
The movie was screened nationwide on the 25 May 2018.

Cast 

 Ramsey Nouah
 Chioma Omeruha
 Emem Inwang
 Francis Onwochei
 Sola Sobowale
 Ireti Doyle
 Monalisa Chinda
 Desmond Elliot
 Kunle Afolayan
 Bryan Okwara
 Benjamin Toutoui
 Patrick Onyeke
 Funny bone.

References 

2018 films
English-language Nigerian films
Nigerian comedy films
2010s English-language films